Bruno de Lara Fuchs (born 1 April 1999) is a Brazilian footballer who plays as a centre-back for Atlético Mineiro, on loan from CSKA Moscow.

Club career

Internacional
Fuchs made Fuchs professional debut for Internacional on 28 July 2019, in a Série A 1–0 victory over Ceará.

CSKA Moscow
On 25 August 2020, Fuchs signed a five-year contract with Russian Premier League club CSKA Moscow. On 21 November 2021, Fuchs started the game against FC Khimki, which was his first league appearance for CSKA since August 2020, as he suffered from recurring injuries in the interim. In the 15th minute of the game, he was sent-off.

Atlético Mineiro (loan)
On 16 December 2022, Fuchs joined Atlético Mineiro on a year-long loan deal from CSKA Moscow, with an option to make the move permanent.

International career
Fuchs represented Brazil at youth level in the 2017 and 2019 editions of the Toulon Tournament, winning the latter. He also played at the 2020 CONMEBOL Pre-Olympic Tournament.

On 2 July 2021, Fuchs was named in the Brazil squad for the 2020 Summer Olympics.

Career statistics

Club

Honours
Brazil U22
Toulon Tournament: 2019

Brazil Olympic
Summer Olympics: 2020

References

External links
 Bruno Fuchs on Internacional's official website
 
 

1999 births
Living people
People from Ponta Grossa
Brazilian footballers
Brazil youth international footballers
Association football defenders
Sport Club Internacional players
PFC CSKA Moscow players
Clube Atlético Mineiro players
Campeonato Brasileiro Série A players
Russian Premier League players
Brazilian expatriate footballers
Expatriate footballers in Russia
Olympic footballers of Brazil
Footballers at the 2020 Summer Olympics
Olympic medalists in football
Olympic gold medalists for Brazil
Medalists at the 2020 Summer Olympics
Brazilian people of German descent
Sportspeople from Paraná (state)